The Pro Football Writers of America (PFWA), sometimes known as Pro Football Writers Association, is an organization that purports to be "[the] official voice of pro football writers, promoting and fighting for access to NFL personnel to best serve the public." Goals of the organization include improving access to practices and locker rooms, developing working relationships with all teams, and ensuring that football writers are treated in a professional manner.  By the mid-2000s the group consisted of over 300 writers, editors, and columnists who cover pro football. The PFWA also issue several awards and honors following each NFL season.

Awards

All-NFL Team

NFL Most Valuable Player Award

NFL Offensive Player of the Year Award

NFL Defensive Player of the Year Award

NFL Rookie of the Year Award

NFL Comeback Player of the Year Award

George Halas Award

Note: The George Halas Award should not be confused with the Newspaper Enterprise Association's George Halas Trophy that was awarded to the NFL defensive player of the year from 1966 to 1996, or the NFL's George Halas Trophy that is awarded to the National Football Conference champion.

Good Guy Award
The PFWA Good Guy Award has been given annually since 2005 to an NFL player "for his qualities and professional style in helping pro football writers do their jobs."

Jack Horrigan Award
Since 1974, the PFWA has given an annual award named in memory of sportswriter Jack Horrigan, to honor a league or club official "for his or her qualities and professional style in helping the pro football writers do their job." The most recent five winners have been Thomas Dimitroff (2012), Mike Signora (NFL Vice President of Football Communications) (2013), Pete Carroll (2014), Bruce Arians (2015), and John Elway (2016).

Bill Nunn Award
See: Bill Nunn Award

Rozelle Award
The Rozelle Award is given to the club public relations department that consistently strives for excellence in its dealings and relationships with the media. It is named after Pete Rozelle, who served as commissioner of the NFL from 1960 until 1989.

Past presidents
 George Strickler, Chicago Tribune
 Tony Atchison, Washington Star
 John Steadman, Baltimore News-American
 William Guthrie, New Haven Journal
 Joe King, New York World-Telegram
 Dick Connor, Denver Post
 Edwin Pope, Miami Herald
 Larry Felser, Buffalo News
 Paul Zimmerman, Sports Illustrated
 Larry Fox, New York Daily News
 Bob Roesler, New Orleans Times Picayune
 Cooper Rollow, Chicago Tribune
 Vito Stellino, Baltimore Morning Sun
 Glenn Sheeley, Atlanta Journal-Constitution
 Don Pierson, Chicago Tribune
 Ira Miller, San Francisco Chronicle
 Vic Carucci, Buffalo News
 Len Pasquarelli, Atlanta Journal-Constitution
 Steve Schoenfeld, Arizona Republic
 John Clayton, Tacoma News-Tribune
 Adam Schefter, Denver Post
 John McClain, Houston Chronicle
 David Elfin, Washington Times
 Charean Williams, Fort Worth Star-Telegram
 Mark Gaughan, Buffalo News
 D.Orlando Ledbetter, Atlanta Journal-Constitution 
 Jeff Legwold, ESPN
 Lindsay Jones, The Athletic

See also
Football Writers Association of America (college)
Baseball Writers' Association of America
National Collegiate Baseball Writers Association
Pro Basketball Writers Association
United States Basketball Writers Association (college)
Professional Hockey Writers Association
National Sports Media Association

References

External links
 

American football mass media
American sports journalism organizations
Journalism-related professional associations